David Farragut School is a historic school building located in the West Kensington neighborhood of Philadelphia, Pennsylvania. It was built in 1873 and is a three-story, four bay, stone building in the Italianate-style. An addition was built in 1915. It features brownstone and limestone trim.  It was named for Admiral David Farragut (1801–1870).

It was added to the National Register of Historic Places in 1986.

References

School buildings on the National Register of Historic Places in Philadelphia
Italianate architecture in Pennsylvania
School buildings completed in 1873
Upper North Philadelphia